Sarajevo Beer Festival is an annual beer festival held in Sarajevo, Bosnia and Herzegovina. Established in 2012, the festival is held annually over 3 days as a showcase event for various beer producers. In addition to domestic and foreign brews, the festival features live music performances each evening. It has become the largest beer festival in Bosnia and Herzegovina and third largest in the former Yugoslavia, behind the Belgrade Beer Fest and the Macedonia Beer Festival in Prilep. The festival venue is the 17 acre (70,000 square meter) open-air former speed skating ring and encompassing park that makes up part of the Zetra Olympic Center.

History

References

External links
Sarajevo Beer Festival - Official website

Annual fairs
Music festivals in Bosnia and Herzegovina
Tourist attractions in Sarajevo
Annual events in Bosnia and Herzegovina
2003 establishments in Serbia
Music festivals established in 2012
Festivals in Sarajevo